Involuntary Witness is a legal thriller by Italian writer Gianrico Carofiglio, published originally in 2002 and translated into English by Patrick Creagh in 2005.

2002 Italian novels
Legal thriller novels
Novels by Gianrico Carofiglio
Italian thriller novels